Disciples of Steel is a 1993 video game developed by American studio Megasoft Entertainment and published by FormGen for DOS and Atari ST.

Gameplay
Disciples of Steel is a role-playing game.

Reception
In 1996, Computer Gaming World declared Disciples of Steel the 48th-worst computer game ever released.

Disciples of Steel has received mixed reviews. On February 16, 2016 the review site CRPG Addict rated Disciples of Steel the 7th greatest classic RPG of all time.

Reviews
ST Format (Apr, 1992)
PC Player (May, 1994)
Computer Gaming World (Jul, 1994)
Games-X (Feb 20, 1992)

References

1993 video games
Atari ST games
DOS games
FormGen games
Role-playing video games
Single-player video games
Video games developed in the United States